Arnold Koop (16 July 1922, Saint Petersburg Governorate – 21 April 1988 Moscow) was a Soviet and Estonian historian.

From 1960 until 1968 he was the rector of Tallinn Pedagogical Institute. 1970-1988 he was the rector of the University of Tartu.

References

1922 births
1988 deaths
20th-century Estonian historians
20th-century Estonian philosophers
People from Saint Petersburg Governorate
Rectors of the University of Tartu
Rectors of universities in Estonia
Tallinn University alumni
Academic staff of the University of Tartu
Corresponding Members of the USSR Academy of Pedagogical Sciences
Members of the Central Committee of the Communist Party of Estonia
Eighth convocation members of the Supreme Soviet of the Soviet Union
Ninth convocation members of the Supreme Soviet of the Soviet Union
Tenth convocation members of the Supreme Soviet of the Soviet Union
Eleventh convocation members of the Supreme Soviet of the Soviet Union
Heroes of Socialist Labour
Recipients of the Medal "For Courage" (Russia)
Recipients of the Order of Lenin
Recipients of the Order of the Red Banner of Labour
Estonian historians
Estonian philosophers
Soviet historians
Soviet philosophers
Burials at Raadi cemetery